Jia Tong (Chinese: 贾童) is a Chinese athlete who competes in diving.

Major achievements
She earned the gold medal with Chen Ruolin at the 2006 Asian Games.

References
Chinese win women's synchro platform diving gold _Latest News—China Economic Net 

1991 births
Living people
Chinese female divers
Asian Games medalists in diving
Sportspeople from Sichuan
People from Nanchong
Divers at the 2006 Asian Games
World Aquatics Championships medalists in diving
Asian Games gold medalists for China
Medalists at the 2006 Asian Games
21st-century Chinese women